Ungmennafélagið Katla is a sports club located in Vík í Mýrdal, Iceland.

History
Ungmennafélagið Katla was founded on 17 May 2008, when Ungmennafélagið Drangur and Ungmennafélagið Dyrhólaey merged.

Basketball
In 2004, Ungmennafélagið Drangur won the 2. deild karla after beating ÍA in the playoffs final, 79–68, and gained promotion to the second-tier 1. deild karla. The team played two seasons in the 1. deild karla, finishing with a 6–12 record in both the 2004-2005 and 2005–2006 season.

Katla men's basketball team competed in the 2. deild karla during the 2011–2012 season. It finished 8th in group A.

Recent seasons 

Source

Notable players
 Björn Ægir Hjörleifsson
 Justin Shouse
 Jason Harden

Titles
2. deild karla
Winners: 20041

1 as Ungmennafélagið Drangur

References

Basketball teams in Iceland